Pseudolaelia is a small genus belonging to the orchid family (Orchidaceae), the entire genus endemic to Brazil. The abbreviation used in the horticultural trade is Pdla.

Description 
The flowers of these orchids resemble those of Laelia, but the main difference between these two genera lies in the vegetative part.

These orchids occur exclusively in Eastern Brazil, often as epiphytes. Some are lithophytes, forming a thicket on the rocks. Others, as Pseudolaelia vellozicola, are semi-epiphytes and can be found on mat-like communities of Vellozia bushes on inselbergs (dome-shaped granitic or gneissic rock outcrops) in the Brazilian Atlantic rainforest, requiring an adaptation to the extreme environmental conditions (dryness, isolation)

The rhizomes are extended. The pseudobulbs are fusiform, cylindrical to conical, carrying three to eight leaves. These are apical, deciduous, upright, leathery and pointy. The base of the leaves clasps the pseudobulb from the upper third till the apex.

The inflorescence is a long raceme, growing from the apex of the pseudobulb, with an undefined number of small white to pink flowers, opening in a consecutive manner clustered at the apex.

Pollination is performed by hummingbirds, butterflies, dipterids and hymenopterids. The flowers of Pseudolaelia corcovadensis, being self-compatible, are also pollinated by deceit by the bee Bombus (Fervidobombus) atratus by mimicking a generalized bee-attracting food-flower. However, these visits are rather rare

Species of Pseudolaelia 
Species accepted as of June 2014:

Natural hybrids 
Pseudolaelia × perimii M.Frey -  Espírito Santo  (P. brejetubensis × P. freyi)

References

Books 
 (in French)

External links 

Laeliinae genera
Epiphytic orchids
Endemic orchids of Brazil
Laeliinae